Cloudman may refer to:

 Cloud Man (–1862/1863), a Dakota chief
 Cloudman Hall (Georgia Tech), a dormitory
 Harold C. Cloudman, a California politician 
 John Greenleaf Cloudman (1813–1892), a painter
 Cloudman, a mascot for the Trenton Thunder baseball team